Ryszard Katus (born March 29, 1947) is a Polish athlete, who competed mainly in the men's decathlon event during his career.

Katus was born in Boska Wola. He competed for Poland at the 1972 Summer Olympics held in Munich, Germany, where he won the bronze medal in the men's decathlon event.

He later came to the United States and competed in Masters athletics under the name Richard Katus.

References

 Sports Reference

1947 births
Polish decathletes
Olympic bronze medalists for Poland
Athletes (track and field) at the 1972 Summer Olympics
Athletes (track and field) at the 1976 Summer Olympics
Olympic athletes of Poland
Living people
People from Białobrzegi County
Sportspeople from Masovian Voivodeship
Medalists at the 1972 Summer Olympics
Olympic bronze medalists in athletics (track and field)
Polish masters athletes